The City Centre Campus is one of the four campus areas of the University of Helsinki. It is located at the historic centre of Helsinki. The campus houses the following faculties:

Faculty of Arts
Faculty of Behavioural Sciences
Faculty of Law
Faculty of Social Sciences
Faculty of Theology 

In addition, the university central administration and several independent research institutes.

See also 

Kumpula Campus
Meilahti Campus
University of Helsinki
Viikki Campus

References 

Buildings and structures in Helsinki
University of Helsinki
Campuses